Sean Patrick O’Reilly is the owner and operator of Arcana Studio, a comic book company and animation studio located in British Columbia, Canada. He is considered to be one of the most prolific independent comic book writers in Canada, with his works having been published in eleven countries and in numerous different languages.

Career 
O’Reilly has completed two degrees and a Masters, and teaches college level courses in Vancouver and the UCLA, in addition to being a Mentor and Scriptwriting consultant for Telefilm.

Notable graphic novels include Kade, which has gone on to be one of Arcana's top selling books, and has been published in numerous countries including Italy, Germany, France, Spain, Croatia and Poland. The first series by O’Reilly, Original Sun, came out in 2005, followed by Sun of Perdition in 2007, Shiva's Sun (2008), Rising Sun (2009), Red Sun (2010) and Prodigal Sun (2011). Kade  In 2007, O'Reilly wrote The Clockwork Girl with co-creator Kevin Hanna. The steampunk fairytale went on to win the gold medal in the Moonbeam Awards. He followed up the success of The Clockwork Girl with The Gwaii after being inspired by Haida Gwaii. From 2011 to 2012, Sean O’Reilly wrote a book series called Mighty Mighty Monsters through Capstone Publishers. O’Reilly would later adapt the book series into three 44-minute animated specials of the same name.

Animation career 
O'Reilly created Arcana Studio's animation division in 2012. The studio's animated projects are based on the graphic novels within their library. The animation division's first project was the animated feature The Clockwork Girl, based on the graphic novel, followed by a 13 episode mini-series of Kagagi: The Raven, which aired on APTN in September 2014. This was followed up by the animated feature Pixies in 2015, which included voice actors Christopher Plummer, Bill Paxton and Alexa Vega. O'Reilly wrote, directed and produced Pixies, and also voices the main protagonist, Joe Beck.

In 2016, Sean wrote, directed and produced, Howard Lovecraft and The Frozen Kingdom, the first in the three part trilogy. It is the first animated film adaptation of H.P. Lovecraft's work. The series was based on the graphic novel series written by Bruce Brown and published by Arcana. 

In 2018, Sean directed three animated features The Steam Engines of Oz, The Legend of Hallowaiian, and Howard Lovecraft and the Kingdom of Madness.

Sean O'Reilly is a producer for all of the animated projects produced by Arcana and has written and directed a majority of the projects.

Personal life 
O’Reilly resides in Coquitlam, British Columbia, with his wife, Michelle, and their four children.

Comic book credits
 Clockwork Girl – co-creator/writer
 Dragon's Lair – editor
 Ezra – creator/writer/concept art
 Final Destination – editor
 The Gwaii – creator/writer/concept art
 Kade – creator/writer/concept art
 Kiss – Kompendium editor (through HarperCollins)
 Pixies – creator/write
 Paradox – editor
 Se7en – writer/editor
 The Steam Engines of Oz – creator/writer

TV credits
 HBOs Entourage (Season 2, Episode 9) – set design and Angel Quest concept art
 Kagagi: The Raven – director, producer
 Murder, She Baked (Season 1, Episode 1) - supervising producer
 USAs Psych (Season 1, Episode 8) – set design and Green Spirit concept art
 SpikeTVs Red Lotus – producer, concept development and animation
 When Calls the Heart (Season 2 & Season 3, Episode 1) - consulting producer

Video game credits
 Capcom's Rockemen (writing and development)
 Disney Interactive's Turok (concept development and comic books)

Movie credits
 A Dangerous Man (Paramount Pictures) – producer
 American Siege (Shout! Studios) - executive producer
 Apex (RLJE Films) - producer
 Beatdown (Lions Gate Entertainment) – producer and writer
 A Christmas Detour (Hallmark Channel) - supervising producer
 Circle of Pain (Lions Gate Entertainment) – producer and writer
 Clockwork Girl – producer
 Corrective Measures – director, writer and producer
 Dancing Ninja – animation director
 Deadlock (Saban Films) - executive producer
 Detective Knight: Independence (Lions Gate Entertainment) - executive producer
 Detective Knight: Redemption (Lions Gate Entertainment) - executive producer
 Detective Knight: Rogue (Lions Gate Entertainment) - executive producer
 Gasoline Alley (Saban Films) - executive producer
 Go Fish – writer, director, and producer
 The Gwaii (short film) - director, writer and producer
 Hot Seat (Lions Gate Entertainment) - executive producer 
 Howard Lovecraft and the Frozen Kingdom – director, writer and producer
 Howard Lovecraft and the Kingdom of Madness – director, writer and producer
 Howard Lovecraft and the Undersea Kingdom – director, writer and producer
 The Legend of Hallowaiian – director, executive producer
 Mighty Mighty Monsters in Halloween Havoc - executive producer
 Mighty Mighty Monsters in New Fears Eve - executive producer
 Mighty Mighty Monsters in Pranks for the Memories - executive producer
 Panda vs. Aliens - director, writer and producer
 Paradise City (Saban Films) - executive producer
 Paradox – producer
 Pixies – director, writer and producer
 The Reckoning - executive producer 
 Red Sonja: Queen of Plagues - producer
 Social Animals (Paramount Pictures) - executive producer
 The Steam Engines of Oz – director, writer and producer
 White Elephant - executive producer
 A Wish For Christmas (Hallmark Channel) - supervising producer

Filmography

Selected awards
 Business in Vancouver's Top 40 Under 40 (2008)
 Author and co-creator of The Clockwork Girl, winner of the Moonbeam Award for Top Children's Graphic Novel (2008)
 Foreword Magazine's recognition as one of the top Graphic Novels & Comics for The Clockwork Girl (2008), presented at Book Expo America
 Author of The Gwaii, winner of the Moonbeam Award for Top Children's Graphic Novel (2009)

References

Canadian comics writers
Canadian male voice actors
Arcana Studio
People from Coquitlam
People from Maple Ridge, British Columbia
Living people
1974 births